Cameron Darnell Phillips (born December 16, 1995) is a professional gridiron football wide receiver for the Toronto Argonauts of the Canadian Football League (CFL). He played college football at Virginia Tech.

Professional career

Buffalo Bills
Phillips signed with the Buffalo Bills as an undrafted free agent on May 11, 2018. He was waived on September 1, 2018 and was signed to the practice squad the next day. He was promoted to the active roster on October 18, 2018. He was waived on November 5, 2018 and was re-signed to the practice squad. He signed a reserve/future contract with the Bills on December 31, 2018.

On August 31, 2019, Phillips was waived by the Bills.

Houston Roughnecks
On October 15, 2019, Phillips was drafted in the sixth round of the 2020 XFL Draft by the Houston Roughnecks. In the Roughnecks' first game against the Los Angeles Wildcats, Phillips helped score a 50-yard touchdown, giving the Roughnecks their first points and helping the team win a 37–17 victory against the Wildcats. In Week 2 against the St. Louis BattleHawks, Phillips caught seven balls for 54 yards and scored three touchdowns, winning the XFL's Star of the Week. In Week 3 Phillips caught three touchdowns again, to go along with 8 receptions for 194 yards, including an 84 yard score from PJ Walker. His performance in week 3 proved to be enough for Phillips to win his second straight XFL Star of the Week. In what turned out to be the final week of the XFL season, Phillips hauled in 10 receptions for 122 yards and 2 touchdowns. Phillips again earned Player of the Week for his performance. Phillips finished the season with 31 receptions for a league high 455 yards and 9 touchdowns. He had his contract terminated when the league suspended operations on April 10, 2020.

Carolina Panthers 
Phillips had a tryout with the Carolina Panthers on August 23, 2020, and signed with the team three days later. He was waived on September 5, 2020.

Hamilton Tiger-Cats
Phillips signed with the Hamilton Tiger-Cats of the CFL on June 10, 2021.  Phillips was cut in the 3rd week of training camp on July 29, 2021.

Toronto Argonauts
On July 30, 2021, Phillips signed with the Toronto Argonauts. Phillips spend most of the 2021 season on the practice roster, but made his CFL debut in the last game of the season on November 16, 2021, against the Edmonton Elks. In 2022, he was assigned to the practice roster after training camp, but was moved up to the active roster due to injuries in the Argonauts' receiving corps.

Career statistics

References

External links
Toronto Argonauts bio
Buffalo Bills bio
Virginia Tech Hokies bio

1995 births
Living people
American football wide receivers
Buffalo Bills players
Carolina Panthers players
Hamilton Tiger-Cats players
Houston Roughnecks players
People from Laurel, Maryland
Players of American football from Maryland
Sportspeople from Anne Arundel County, Maryland
Sportspeople from Montgomery County, Maryland
Virginia Tech Hokies football players
Toronto Argonauts players